Mains may refer to:

 Mains electricity ("line power" in the United States)
 Mains electricity by country
 Electricity transmission
 Public utility, "mains services", including electricity, natural gas, water, and sewage disposal 
 Main course, the primary dish of a meal, following a starter
 Mains (Scotland), the main buildings of a farm
 BMX racing
 Water mains 
 Author abbreviation for Edwin Butterworth Mains

See also 
 Main (disambiguation)
 Mane (disambiguation)